COMO The Halkin  is a 5-star hotel in London, England. It is located in Belgravia, one of London's most affluent districts, just to the east of Belgrave Square in Halkin Street. It is operated by COMO Hotels and Resorts. It is considered to be one of the first boutique hotels in London. The Halkin has a Georgian façade of bricks and stone, but its interior and its 41 rooms and suites has a more contemporary design. COMO The Halkin is also the first hotel for COMO Hotels and Resorts. The hotel spent about £1 million on each of the 41 guest rooms and suites designed by Laboratorio Associati Italy.

Restaurants

nahm
COMO The Halkin originally hosted a Michelin-starred Thai restaurant named nahm, run by Australian chef David Thompson, from 2001 until December 2012. In 2010, a second (and currently only) nahm restaurant was opened at the Metropolitan Bangkok.

Ametsa with Arzak Instruction
In March 2013, a new restaurant was opened called Ametsa with Arzak Instruction (commonly referred to as simply Ametsa), serving Basque cuisine and run by a team that includes Elena Arzak and her father Juan Mari Arzak.

References

External links
Official website

Belgravia
Hotels in London